Za (majuscule: Զ; minuscule: զ; Armenian: զա) is the sixth letter of the Armenian alphabet. It represents the voiced alveolar sibilant (/z/) in both Eastern and Western varieties of Armenian. Created by Mesrop Mashtots in the 5th century, it has a numerical value of 6. Its shape in capital form is similar to the Arabic numeral 2 and two other Armenian letters, Dza (Ձ) and Je (Ջ). Its shape in lowercase form is also similar to the minuscule form of the Latin Q (q), the minuscule form of the Cyrillic letter Ԛ (ԛ), and the minuscule form of another Armenian letter, Gim (գ).

Computing codes

Gallery

See also
 Armenian alphabet
 Mesrop Mashtots
 Dza (letter)
 Q (Latin)
 Ԛ (Cyrillic)
 Gim (letter)
 Z

References

External links
 Զ on Wiktionary
 զ on Wiktionary

Armenian letters